Johan Ljung (1717–1787) was a Swedish ornamental sculptor attached to the Stockholm Palace.

Johan Ljung was employed at the Stockholm Palace, as was his son,  (1743–1819). Johan Ljung is represented in the collection of the National Museum, Stockholm.

References

Notes

1717 births
1787 deaths
Swedish male sculptors
18th-century Swedish artists
18th-century Swedish male artists